Ernst Barkmann (25 August 1919 – 27 June 2009) was a German tank commander in the Waffen-SS of Nazi Germany during World War II. He is known for the actions undertaken at “Barkmann’s Corner", in which it is claimed he halted a major U.S. Army armoured advance in Normandy on 27 July 1944, for which he received the Knight's Cross of the Iron Cross.

SS career
Barkmann joined the Nazi Party on 1 September 1938 and served in the Reich Labour Service from November 1938 to March 1939. After this he joined the SS on 1 April 1939, and served during the occupation of Poland. He was posted for a time as an instructor of SS volunteers in the Netherlands. In winter 1942/43 he was posted to the SS Division Das Reich on the Eastern Front, with which he took part in the Third Battle of Kharkov.

In February 1944, Das Reich was ordered to France to form a part of the 5th Panzer Army, the armoured reserve for the expected Allied invasion. Following Operation Overlord, the Allied invasion of June 1944, the division reached the front in early July and fought against the American forces near Saint-Lô. Barkmann was awarded the Knight's Cross of the Iron Cross. Barkmann participated in the Ardennes Offensive in December 1944 and the fighting on the Eastern Front in the spring of 1945.

Barkmann and his crew were credited with the destruction of at least 82 Soviet, British and US tanks, 136 miscellaneous armoured fighting vehicles and 43 anti-tank guns, but Barkmann's reputed actions in Normandy were challenged by the military historian Steven Zaloga, who asserts that he analysed the Allied war records, and was unable to locate the losses claimed by Barkmann. He attributed the narrative of Barkmann's Corner to the "propaganda efforts of the Waffen-SS".

Awards and decorations
1939 Wound Badge in Black, 1939
1939 Iron Cross 2nd Class, 14 July 1941 
Infantry Assault Badge in Silver, 18 February 1942
1939 Iron Cross 1st Class, 1 August 1944
Knight's Cross of the Iron Cross, 27 August 1944 as Panzer commander in the 4./SS-Panzer-Regiment 2 "Das Reich"
1939 Wound Badge in Silver and Gold
Panzer Badge Second Type and Third Type

See also
Waffen-SS in popular culture
Panzer ace

Notes

References
 
 
 
 
 

1919 births
2009 deaths
People from Segeberg
SS non-commissioned officers
People from the Province of Schleswig-Holstein
Panzer commanders
Recipients of the Knight's Cross of the Iron Cross
Waffen-SS personnel
Reich Labour Service members
Military personnel from Schleswig-Holstein